Tinde, also known as Tindium or Tindion (Τίνδιον), was a town of Chalcidice in ancient Macedonia. It belonged to the Delian League since it appears in the tribute registry of Athens for the year 434/3 BCE, where it paid a phoros of 3000 drachmas jointly with the cities of Cithas, Gigonus, Smila and Lisaea.

Its site is unlocated, but probably in Bottiaea.

References

Populated places in ancient Macedonia
Former populated places in Greece
Geography of ancient Chalcidice
Members of the Delian League
Lost ancient cities and towns
Bottiaea